Hattenberger is a German surname. Notable people with the surname include:

Matthias Hattenberger (born 1978), Austrian footballer, son of Roland
Roland Hattenberger (born 1948), Austrian footballer

German-language surnames